Marzena Karpińska (born 19 February 1988, in Biłgoraj) is a Polish weightlifter. She won a gold medal at the 2012 European Championships in Antalya, Turkey with a 187 kg total. She weighed in at 47.74 kg and had snatch lifts of 81, 83 and 85 kg and clean and jerk lifts of 98, 100 and 102 kg. She was also a silver medalist at the 2010 European Championships and bronze medalist at the 2009 European Championships in the 48 kg category.

At the 2008 Summer Olympics in Beijing, Karpińska placed 9th in the 48 kg category, with a total of 171 kg. She did not compete in the 2012 Summer Olympics in London due to doping allegations.

References

External links
 

1988 births
Living people
People from Biłgoraj
Polish female weightlifters
Olympic weightlifters of Poland
Weightlifters at the 2008 Summer Olympics
Sportspeople from Lublin Voivodeship
European Weightlifting Championships medalists
20th-century Polish women
21st-century Polish women